TCOM may refer to:
TCOM (linguistics), time of completion – a temporal reference for establishing tense
Texas College of Osteopathic Medicine, a college of the University of North Texas in Fort Worth, Texas
The Colour of Magic, a Discworld novel by Terry Pratchett
Transcutaneous oxygen measurement - an assessment of the oxygen level beneath the skin